Bermondsey (also known as St. Mary Magdalen, Bermondsey) was a parish in the metropolitan area of London, England.

The ancient parish was part of Hundred of Brixton and County of Surrey. In 1855, it was included in the area of responsibility of the Metropolitan Board of Works (MBW). The act, establishing the MBW, also incorporated a new elected local authority for the parish known as The Vestry of the Parish of Bermondsey in the County of Surrey.

The population of the parish in 1896 was 84,632, and it had adopted the Public Libraries Act 1850 in 1887. For electoral purposes, the parish was divided into four wards and had 120 elected vestrymen.

In 1889, the area of the Metropolitan Board was reconstituted as the County of London, and Bermondsey was transferred to the new county. In 1900, the County of London was divided into twenty-eight metropolitan boroughs. The parish became the core part of the Metropolitan Borough of Bermondsey, which also covered the parish of Rotherhithe, and the area of the St Olave's District Board of Works (consisting of the two parishes of Southwark St John Horsleydown and Southwark St Olave and St Thomas). A borough council replaced the vestries and board, and in 1904, all four parishes in the borough were merged as the single civil parish of Bermondsey.

Ecclesiastical parish 
The ancient parish, dedicated to St Mary Magdalene and centred on the church of St Mary Magdalen Bermondsey, was in the Diocese of Winchester until 1877, then the Diocese of Rochester until 1905, and then finally in the Diocese of Southwark. From 1840, as the population of Bermondsey increased, a number of new parishes were formed:
 St James, Bermondsey in 1840
 Christ Church, Bermondsey in 1845
 St Paul, Bermondsey in 1846
 St Anne, Bermondsey in 1871
 St Crispin, Bermondsey in 1875
 St Augustine of Hippo, South Bermondsey in 1878
 St Andrew, Bermondsey in 1882
 St Luke, Bermondsey in 1885.

In addition, as the population of neighbouring Camberwell increased, parts of Bermondsey parish were included in the new parish of
 St Philip, Avondale Square in 1876 with parts of St Giles, Camberwell

Politics

Under the Metropolis Management Act 1855 any parish that exceeded 2,000 ratepayers was to be divided into wards; as such the incorporated vestry of St Mary Magdalen Bermondsey was divided into four wards (electing vestrymen): No. 1 (9), No. 2 (9), No. 3 (9) and No. 4 (9).

In 1894 as its population had increased the incorporated vestry was re-divided into six wards (electing vestrymen): No. 1 (21), No. 2 (24), No. 3 (21), No. 4 (21), No. 5 (18) and No. 6 (15).

References

The London Manual 1899-1900 edited by Robert Donald (Edward Lloyd Ltd., 1899)

History of the London Borough of Southwark
Parishes governed by vestries (Metropolis)
Former civil parishes in London
Bills of mortality parishes